Joseph Spencer Payne (29 April 1829 – 12 April 1880) was an English cricketer. Payne was a right-handed batsman who bowled left-arm roundarm medium pace.

Payne was born at East Grinstead in Sussex in 1829. He made his first-class cricket debut for Sussex County Cricket Club against MCC at Lord's in 1861. He made a second first-class appearance for Sussex in the same season against Kent and went on to play once for Kent against Yorkshire in 1864.

Payne died at Greenwich in Kent in April 1880 aged 50. His brothers, Charles and Richard, played first-class cricket, as did his nephews William Payne and Alfred Payne.

References

External links

1829 births
1880 deaths
People from East Grinstead
English cricketers
Sussex cricketers
Kent cricketers